Robert L. Clifford (December 17, 1924 – November 29, 2014) was an associate justice of the New Jersey Supreme Court.

He was born in 1924 in Passaic, New Jersey, and attended Montclair Academy, graduating in the class of 1942. He received a Bachelor's degree from Lehigh University and an LL.B. from the Duke University School of Law in 1950. In 1973 he was appointed by Governor William T. Cahill to the Supreme Court of New Jersey, where he served until his retirement in December 1994. In 1989, he was convicted of drunk driving. He was counsel to the firm McElroy, Deutsch, Mulvaney & Carpenter LLP in Morristown, New Jersey. He died in his sleep at his home in Chester Township, New Jersey, on November 29, 2014. He was 89.

References

1924 births
Justices of the Supreme Court of New Jersey
2014 deaths
Duke University School of Law alumni
Lehigh University alumni
Montclair Kimberley Academy alumni
New Jersey lawyers
People from Chester Township, New Jersey
Politicians from Passaic, New Jersey
20th-century American judges
20th-century American lawyers